Two Scent's Worth is a 1955 Warner Bros. Merrie Melodies short directed by Chuck Jones. The short was released on October 15, 1955, and stars Pepé Le Pew.

Plot
In the small village of Nasty Pass, within the French Alps, a man (in fact a bank robber) visits a fishmonger to buy a sardine, and then returns to a remote flat. The man then uses the sardine as bait, catching a cat (Penelope Pussycat) who is lured by the fish. The man then paints a white stripe on her back to make her look like a skunk to scare away the patrons in a nearby bank. The bank robber makes off with the money and comes across Pepé Le Pew, mistaking him for Penelope at first until Pepé's odor proves otherwise, causing the burglar to run back to the village and turn himself in.

As Penelope wanders out the bank, Pepé sees her and falls in love. He chases her out of the village and into a cable car, which Penelope accidentally activates. Trying to get away from Pepé, she travels along the cable up to a ski jump and is sent flying when she stands on a stray ski, Pepé follows on his own pair of skis until he hits a tree. While Penelope continues on her own ski, Pepé swings across the trees to catch up with her and reunite with his own skis in the process.

A chase across the snow follows with Pepé slowly gaining, so Penelope speeds her ski up, but when she sees a cliff edge, she has to slow down and comes to a stop just inches above the edge. Pepé crashes into her and they go off the edge. Penelope holds onto him tight, more concerned with the fall than his odor but Pepé deploys a heart-shaped parachute, telling the audience that "A true gentleman must be prepared for anything". The cartoon ends with a heart-shaped iris-out to a red background.

References

External links

1955 films
1955 animated films
1955 short films
1950s English-language films
1950s Warner Bros. animated short films
Merrie Melodies short films
Films scored by Milt Franklyn
Warner Bros. short films
Warner Bros. Cartoons animated short films
Short films directed by Chuck Jones
Animated films about cats
Films set in France
Pepé Le Pew films
Films set in the Alps
Penelope Pussycat films